The Atherton House, also known as the Faxon Atherton Mansion, is a historic building in San Francisco, California, United States. The style of the house, a blend of Queen Anne and Stick-Eastlake, has been described as both "eclectic" and "bizarre".

Architecture 
The house was built in 1881–1882 in the Queen Anne style with horizontal lines, a clipped gable, and a short tower. The architect is thought to have been John Marquis, but it has also been attributed to the Moore Brothers, who are depicted in other accounts as the initial builders.

History
It was constructed for Dominga de Goñi Atherton (1823–1890) after the death of her husband Faxon Atherton. She was the mother-in-law of novelist Gertrude Atherton, who wrote about the house in her memoirs. Newspaper articles about the house when the housewarming was held in 1882 described it as picturesque, but appearing to be a relic of an earlier time. The reporter also noted that the height of the rooms created a claustrophobic effect on visitors. Possibly in answer to the comments, Dominga hired Charles Lee Tilden to improve the house.

After Dominga Atherton's death in 1890, the mansion was sold to Edgar Mills, brother of Darius Ogden Mills of the Bank of California, and in 1900 was renumbered from 1950 to 1990 California St. In 1908 it was purchased by George Chauncey Boardman, a real-estate magnate and president of San Francisco Fire Insurance, whose house had been destroyed in the 1906 earthquake and fire. His widow and other family members lived there until 1923, when it was bought by Charles J. Rousseau, an architect, who subdivided it into 13 apartments. His widow Carrie lived there with fifty cats until her death in 1974.  it was still subdivided.

The house is purportedly haunted by as many as four ghosts, including Carrie Rousseau, and is featured on ghost tours. The commonly cited story is that the original ghost is George H. B. Atherton, who died at sea in the South Pacific in 1887 and whose body was shipped back to San Francisco in a rum barrel, but the barrel was delivered to the docks, not to the house.

References

Buildings and structures in San Francisco
Houses completed in 1881
San Francisco Designated Landmarks
California Historical Landmarks
Houses on the National Register of Historic Places in San Francisco
Reportedly haunted locations in San Francisco